Zhang Yuehong (born November 9, 1975 in Shenyang, Liaoning) is a volleyball player from Liaoning, China.

Clubs
 Liaoning (1993–2002)
 RC Cannes (2002–2003)
 Liaoning (2003–2008)
 Toray Arrows (2008–2009)

Awards

Individuals
 2008-09 Japanese Premier League "Most Valuable Player"
 2008-09 Japanese Premier League "Best 6"

National team
 2003 FIVB World Cup -  Gold Medal
 2004 Summer Olympics -  Gold Medal

References

FIVB profile

1975 births
Living people
Olympic gold medalists for China
Olympic volleyball players of China
Volleyball players at the 2004 Summer Olympics
Olympic medalists in volleyball
Volleyball players from Shenyang
Medalists at the 2004 Summer Olympics
Asian Games medalists in volleyball
Volleyball players at the 2002 Asian Games
Chinese women's volleyball players
Asian Games gold medalists for China
Medalists at the 2002 Asian Games
Wing spikers
Chinese expatriate sportspeople in Japan
Chinese expatriates in France
Expatriate volleyball players in France
Expatriate volleyball players in Japan
21st-century Chinese women